The Viet Nam Red Cross Society, alternatively the Vietnam Red Cross Society or the Vietnamese Red Cross Society, is a member (National Society) of the International Federation of Red Cross and Red Crescent Societies and has its headquarters in Hanoi.  The organisation was established during the First Indochina War, and originally had two branches.  The Northern branch was established in Hanoi in 1946, and the Southern branch was established by Dr Ho Van Nhut in Saigon in 1951. 

The Southern branch functioned separately from the Northern Branch and was officially recognized by the International Committee of the Red Cross, to address the increasing needs for assistance to Vietnamese civilians caught in the conflict between North and South Vietnam during the Indochina War and to those affected by natural disasters. The official name of the organization was Vietnamese Red Cross (VRC), with its headquarters at an avenue in central Saigon named after the organization. The VRC played an important role in the program of aid to the million refugees from North to South Vietnam, following the Geneva Agreement in 1954.

References

External links
Vietnam Red Cross Profile
Vietnam Red Cross official web site 

Vietnam
1946 establishments in Vietnam
Organizations established in 1946
Medical and health organizations based in Vietnam